Eternity SF, also known as Eternity Science Fiction and Eternity, was a semi-professional science fiction magazine published by Stephen Gregg out of Sandy Springs, South Carolina.  The magazine was issued from 1972–1975 and was briefly revived from 1979–1980.  It contained stories from famous writers such as Orson Scott Card, Glen Cook, Philip K. Dick and Roger Zelazny.

Issues
Eternity SF Vol. 1, No 1 (1972)
Eternity SF Vol. 1, No 2 (1973)
Eternity SF Vol. 1, No 3 (1974)
Eternity SF Vol. 1, No 4 (1975)
Eternity SF Vol. 1, No 1 (1979)
Eternity SF Vol. 1, No 2 (1980)

Famous contributors

Philip K. Dick
Dick's autobiographical essay "Notes Made Late At Night By A Weary SF Writer" appeared in the (1972) issue of Eternity SF.  It was later published in The Shifting Realities of Philip K. Dick (1995).

Glen Cook
Cook's short story "Sunrise" appeared in the (1973) issue of Eternity SF.  It takes place in Cook's Starfishers universe.

Roger Zelazny
Zelazny's short story "A Knight for Merytha" appeared in the (1974) and in the (1979) issues of Eternity SF.  It was later published in Zelazny's short story collection Dilvish, the Damned (1982).

Orson Scott Card
Card's short story "The Tinker" appeared in the (1980) issue of Eternity SF.  It was later published in Card's omnibus The Worthing Saga (1990).

See also
 List of defunct American periodicals

References

External links
 Locus mag

Annual magazines published in the United States
Defunct science fiction magazines published in the United States
Magazines established in 1972
Magazines disestablished in 1980
Magazines published in South Carolina
Science fiction magazines established in the 1970s